The Women's 20 km Walk event at the 2009 World Championships in Athletics was held throughout the city of Berlin on August 16, beginning and ending at the Brandenburg Gate.

Undefeated since May 2007, the Olympic and World champion Olga Kaniskina was a clear favourite. Russian champion and second fastest of the year Vera Sokolova was predicted as a possible medallist, as were Sabine Krantz and Kjersti Platzer who had both won on the racewalking circuit prior to the competition. Amongst the other fastest athletes before the championships were Russians Anisya Kirdyapkina and Larisa Emelyanova, while Olympic medallist Elisa Rigaudo and Universiade medallist Masumi Fuchise were suggested as other contenders for the podium.

Competing on the course along the Unter den Linden boulevard, German Sabine Krantz led early on, but dropped out halfway into the race, and Norwegian Platzer was disqualified with five kilometres to go. Kaniskina emerged as the clear winner, becoming the first woman to win the racewalking gold in consecutive championships. Forty-nine seconds behind her was the surprise silver medallist Olive Loughnane, who won Ireland's first championship medal since 2003, and her first ever medal at a major championships. Liu Hong took the bronze, while Russian teenager Kirdyapkina took fourth place.

Kaniskina's victory completed a Russian men's and women's 20 km double with Valeriy Borchin, and she received a winner's prize of $60,000 for her achievement. Her win highlighted her success in an event in which she had won an Olympic gold, two World Championships titles, and a gold in the World Cup in just three years.

On January 15, 2015, Kaniskina's results were disqualified for doping violations.  Most of the athletes coached by Viktor Chegin have received similar bans.  On July 6, 2016, Loughnane will receive the gold medal in a full ceremony at the 2016 European Athletics Championships.

Medalists

Records

Qualification standards

Schedule

Results

References
General
Women's 20 km walk results (Archived 2009-09-08). IAAF. Retrieved on 2009-08-16.
Specific

Walk 20 kilometres
Racewalking at the World Athletics Championships
2009 in women's athletics